Awhina Tamarapa is a New Zealand Māori museum curator and writer in the field of museum studies. She has tribal affiliations to Ngāti Kahungunu, Ngāti Ruanui and Ngāti Pikiao.

Tamarapa has a Master of Philosophy in Museum Studies from Massey University, a Bachelor of Māori Laws and Philosophy from Te Wānanga o Raukawa, Otaki and a Bachelor of Arts from Victoria University of Wellington, majoring in anthropology.

She has held several positions at the Museum of New Zealand Te Papa Tongarewa: collection manager, concept developer and curator. Exhibitions she has curated for the museum include Kahu Ora/Living Cloaks (2012) and the Ngāti Toa Rangatira iwi exhibition, Whiti Te Ra! The Story of Ngāti Toa Rangatira.

Tamarapa has been a guest speaker in the museum heritage studies post-graduate programme at Victoria University of Wellington for a number of years. She has also written and edited publications on Māori artefacts. She wrote Whatu Kākahu/Māori Cloaks (2011) with Rangi Te Kanawa and Anne Peranteau. This book was a finalist in the New Zealand Post Book Awards 2012 and winner of the arts category in the Kupu Ora Māori Book Awards in 2012.

Publications 
 Rangi Te Kanawa, Awhina Tamarapa, Anne Peranteau. 'Kahu Ora -Living Cloaks, Living Culture', in Brooks, Mary M. and Eastop, Dinah D. (Eds.), Refashioning and Redress: Conserving and Displaying Dress. Los Angeles: Getty Conservation Institute
 Tamarapa. A. (2004). Selected texts. In Icons/Ngā Taonga-Treasures of Te Papa Collections. Wellington: Te Papa Press.
 Tamarapa, A. (2007). Five essays in Smith, Huhana. Editor (Ed.), Taiaawhio II: 18 New Conversations with Contemporary Māori Artists. Wellington: Te Papa Press.
 Tamarapa, A. (2007). Weaving a Journey. In Labrum, B., McKergow, F., & Gibson, S. (Eds.), Looking Flash: Clothing of Aotearoa New Zealand (pp.94–111 ). Auckland: Auckland University Press.
 Tamarapa, A. Muka taonga (treasures) in the collections of the Museum of New Zealand Te Papa Tongarewa (2009). Combined (NZ and Aus) Conference of the Textile Institute. Conference Proceedings, CD.
 Tamarapa, A. (2011). Mere Ngareta’s Kahu Kiwi. In McKergow, Fiona and Taylor, Kerry. (Eds.), Te Hao Nui The Great Catch: Object Stories from Te Manawa (pp.158–165). Auckland: Random House.
 Tamarapa, A. (Ed.).(2011). Whatu Kākahu / Māori Cloaks . Wellington: Te Papa Press.
 Awhina Tamarapa and Patricia Wallace. ‘Māori clothing and adornment – kakahu Māori’, Te Ara – the Encyclopedia of New Zealand, updated 27 August 2013

References

Living people
Year of birth missing (living people)
Massey University alumni
Victoria University of Wellington alumni
Ngāti Kahungunu people
Ngāti Ruanui people
Ngāti Pikiao people